Nadia Gautschi (born 20 April 1954) is a Swiss archer. She competed in the women's individual event at the 1988 Summer Olympics.

References

1954 births
Living people
Swiss female archers
Olympic archers of Switzerland
Archers at the 1988 Summer Olympics
Place of birth missing (living people)